Degilyovka is a village in Bolshebereznikovsky District of the Republic of Mordovia, Russia.

References

Rural localities in Mordovia
Bolshebereznikovsky District